Liptena eukrines is a butterfly in the family Lycaenidae first described by Hamilton Herbert Druce in 1905. It is found in north-western Tanzania, the Democratic Republic of the Congo (Lualaba) and north-western Zambia. The habitat consists of forests.

References

Butterflies described in 1905
Liptena